Hit Reset is the second studio album by The Julie Ruin. It was released on July 8, 2016, on the Hardly Art label.

Critical reception
Hit Reset has a score of 78 out of 100 on Metacritic, indicating that it has received "generally favorable reviews" from music critics.

Accolades

Track listing
Hit Reset
I Decide
Be Nice
Rather Not
Planet You
Let Me Go
Mr. So and So
Record Breaker
Hello Trust No One
I'm Done
Roses More Than Water
Time Is Up
Calverton

References

2016 albums
The Julie Ruin albums
Hardly Art albums